Rogue's March is a 1953 American historical adventure film directed by Allan Davis, with special location sequences directed by Geoffrey Barkas, and starring Peter Lawford, Richard Greene, and Janice Rule. It was partly shot on location in the Khyber Pass.

Plot
In the Victorian era, a British officer is falsely accused of treason and drummed out of his regiment. He re-enlists as a private under an assumed name and tries to prove his innocence.

Cast

Production
MGM made the film in the wake of their success with Kim (1950). That film was written by Leon Gordon, who wrote and produced this. The film was to have starred Stewart Granger and involve extensive location shooting in the Khyber Pass. Patricia Neal was to co star.

However eventually Peter Lawford was cast instead. Directing duties were given to Allan Davis of the Old Vic Company, who was on a tour of American university theatres for the Rockefeller Foundation before being offered an MGM directing contract; in the event, it turned out to be the only film he made for the studio.

Filming started 28 April 1952.

Rogue's March was Lawford's last film under contract to MGM. The cast also included Lawford's father, Lieutenant General Sir Sidney Turing Barlow Lawford, who died of natural causes two days after the film's February 13, 1953 opening.

Reception
According to MGM records the film earned $379,000 in the US and Canada and $328,000 elsewhere, making a loss to the studio of $247,000.

References

External links

1953 films
Metro-Goldwyn-Mayer films
Films set in the British Raj
Films set in London
Films set in the 19th century
1950s historical adventure films
Films shot in Afghanistan
American historical adventure films
American black-and-white films
Films directed by Allan Davis
1950s English-language films
1950s American films